The 1950 Omloop Het Volk was the sixth edition of the Omloop Het Volk cycle race and was held on 5 March 1950. The race started and finished in Ghent. The race was won by André Declerck.

General classification

References

1950
Omloop Het Nieuwsblad
Omloop Het Nieuwsblad